Conductor 786 is a 1912 American silent short comedy film starring William Garwood, Riley Chamberlin, Jean Darnell.

Cast
 Riley Chamberlin as Conductor 786
 William Garwood as The Conductor's Son
 Jean Darnell as The Conductor's Son's Wife
 William B. Wheeler as Superintendent William B. Wheeler

External links

1912 films
1912 comedy films
Thanhouser Company films
Silent American comedy films
American silent short films
American black-and-white films
1912 short films
American comedy short films
1910s American films
1910s English-language films